Alan McKenna is a British actor who played the recurring character Tony Andrews in the BBC soap opera EastEnders. Best known for his role of Patrick McGuire in the BBC soap Doctors, in which he had a minor recurring role from 2001 to 2003 and again in September 2010.

Career 
McKenna's TV work includes Yorkshire Television's The Brides in the Bath, Waking the Dead, The Bill, Judge John Deed, Spooks, Lead Balloon, Waterloo Road, and Life Begins. Alan is also a recurring character in Little Miss Jocelyn. He played Detective Inspector Phil Crabtree in the 2014 crime drama Happy Valley. He voiced various characters in the video game Titanfall.

In 2015 he played Rhodri Probert in the ITV TV series Midsomer Murders episode 17.2 "Murder by Magic". He also wrote, produced and starred in the underwater action film, "Pressure."

His film work includes Blessed with Heather Graham, David Hemmings and Andy Serkis. Second in Command alongside Jean-Claude Van Damme, An American Werewolf in Paris with Julie Delpy and Dangerous Parking.

Personal life 
His great aunt was Odette Hallowes (1912–1995), noted Allied heroine of World War II.

Filmography

Film

Television

References 

British male film actors
British male television actors
Place of birth missing (living people)
1966 births
Living people